Blommersia wittei is a species of frog in the family Mantellidae. It is endemic to Madagascar. Its natural habitats are subtropical or tropical moist lowland forests, dry savanna, moist savanna, swamps, freshwater marshes, intermittent freshwater marshes, plantations, rural gardens, heavily degraded former forest, and ponds.

References

Mantellidae
Endemic frogs of Madagascar
Amphibians described in 1974
Taxa named by Jean Marius René Guibé
Taxonomy articles created by Polbot